is a 2013 Japanese drama film directed by Tatsushi Ōmori. The film is based on the Japanese 2008 novel Sayonara keikoku by Shuichi Yoshida, which intrigued Ōmori with its central mystery of a rape victim and her perpetrator choosing to live together. It won the Special Jury Prize at the 35th Moscow International Film Festival. The ending theme song "Saisakizaka" was written by musician Ringo Sheena, and performed by lead actress Yōko Maki.

Cast
 Yōko Maki
 Anne Suzuki
 Nao Ōmori as Watanabe
 Arata Iura (as Arata)
 Hirofumi Arai
 Masaki Miura
 Mayu Tsuruta
 Mansaku Ikeuchi
 Shima Ohnishi
 Hana Kino
 Izumi Minai

References

External links
 

2013 films
2013 drama films
Japanese drama films
2010s Japanese-language films
Films directed by Tatsushi Ōmori
2010s Japanese films